The Presidential Cabinet was the first  cabinet established by Indonesia following the 17 August 1945 Indonesian Declaration of Independence. It comprised 20 ministers and four officials. Its term of office ran from 2 September to 14 November 1945.

Background

Indonesian had been under Japanese occupation since 1942, but by 1943, realizing they were losing the war, the Japanese appointed Indonesian advisors to the administration and appointed nationalist leader Sukarno leader of a new Central Advisory Board (Chuo Sani-kai ) in Jakarta. On 7 August, the day after the atomic bombing of Hiroshima, the Preparatory Committee for Indonesian Independence or PPKI was established. Sukarno was chairman, and Hatta vice-chairman. On 19 August 1945, this body created 12 ministries for Indonesia's first cabinet. The cabinet as formed contained sanyo as well as officials who had not worked with the Japanese. The cabinet was responsible to President Sukarno.

Composition

President
President: Sukarno
Vice President: Mohammad Hatta

Ministers

Officials holding ministerial status
Chief Justice of the Supreme Court: Dr. Kusumah Atmaja
Attorney General: Gatot Tarunamihardja
State Secretary: Abdoel Affar Pringgodigdo
State Spokesman: Soekarjo Wirjopranoto

Changes
On 22 September 1945, Finance Minister Samsi was replaced by A. A. Maramis on health grounds. In a government decree on 6 October, Soeprijadi, a hero of the Blitar rebellion against the occupying Japanese, was officially appointed Defense Minister. However, as no news was ever heard of him, on 20 October Muhammad Soeljoadikusuma was appointed ad interim Defense Minister. Attorney General Gatot Tarunamihardja resigned on 24 October. As a temporary measure, Chief Justice Kusumah Atmaja was appointed acting Attorney General. Kasman Singodiedjo was appointed to the post on 7 November.

The end of the cabinet
On 11 November 1945, the Central Indonesian National Committee, which was the de facto legislature, demanded the cabinet be responsible to it, not to President Sukarno. Sukarno agreed to this and dismissed the cabinet.

References

 
 Ricklefs (1982), A History of Modern Indonesia, Macmillan Southeast Asian reprint,

Notes

Cabinets of Indonesia
Indonesian National Revolution
1945 establishments in Indonesia
1945 disestablishments in Indonesia
Cabinets established in 1945
Cabinets disestablished in 1945